Drožanje is a settlement just north of Sevnica in east-central Slovenia. The area is part of the historical region of Styria. The Municipality of Sevnica is now included in the Lower Sava Statistical Region.

Churches
There are two churches in the settlement. One is a pilgrimage church dedicated to Saint Roch dating to the early 17th century. The second is dedicated to Saint Martin and has a Romanesque nave that was extended in 1737. Both belong to the Parish of Sevnica.

References

External links
Drožanje at Geopedia

Populated places in the Municipality of Sevnica